The EAE Business School is a private business school founded in 1958 with campuses in Madrid and Barcelona (Spain).

History 
Founded in 1958 by José de Orbaneja y Aragón. In 2006, Grupo Planeta bought EAE Business School. EAE has one campus in Barcelona and one in Madrid.

Accreditations 
EAE offers third-party accreditations : by the Universitat Politècnica de Catalunya for programs in Barcelona, and by the Universidad Rey Juan Carlos for programs in Madrid. They do not work with the University Rey Juan Carlos. They will advertise the programs with the second diploma from URJC, but they will not provide one.

Affiliations 
 Member of AEEDE (Spanish Association of Business Management Schools)
 EFMD (European Foundation for Management Development)
 EBEN (European Business Ethics Network)
 ForQ (Association for Quality in Training)
 CLADEA (Latin American Council of MBA Schools)
 Member of AACSB (The Association to Advance Collegiate Schools of Business), but not accredited

Rankings
 Merco Ranking (2016): The School has held the same position in the education sector as the second most reputable business school in Spain for the third year in a row. In the general company league table, the School ranks in 45th place.
 Merco Ranking (2016) : one of the top Spanish companies with the best talents, ranking among the Top Five Business Schools for the tenth consecutive year. With respect to the Merco Ranking of Corporate Responsibility and Governance, in the 2015 edition, EAE ranked 24th in the general company classification.
 El Mundo Ranking, 2016: For the third year in a row, the newspaper El Mundo has named six EAE masters among the best in their specialist fields in Spain (Master in Corporate Communication Management, Master in Financial Management, Master in Operations & Logistic Management, Master in Commercial & Sales Management, Master in Marketing and Commercial Management, Master in Human Resources Management).
 The Best Global Business Schools Ranking 2016: Prepared by the journal, EAE ranks in 13th place.
 Eduniversal Best Masters Ranking Worldwide 2015-2016: Master in Corporate Communication Management, Master in Supply Chain Management and Master in Human Resources Management ranked among the best in the world.

Media coverage
Some media coverage:
Press: El Economista, El País, La Razón. Radio: Canal Extremadura Radio Cadena Ser Radio Intereconomía RTVE Onda Cero Catalunya Television: Noticias Cuatro Guatevisión Noticias Cuatro

References

External links
 EAE Business School Main Website
 Online EAE Business School Main Website
 Master in MBA - EAE Website

Business schools in Spain
Educational institutions established in 1958
1958 establishments in Spain